Control is a 2013 Chinese-Hong Kong film directed by Kenneth Bi and starring Daniel Wu, Yao Chen, Simon Yam, Leon Dai, Ady An and Shao Bing.

Cast
 Daniel Wu as Mark
 Yao Chen as Jessica
 Simon Yam as Tiger
 Leon Dai as Devil
 Ady An as Mimi
 Shao Bing as Sam

References

External links
 

Hong Kong crime thriller films
2013 films
Films directed by Kenneth Bi
Chinese crime thriller films
Chinese science fiction thriller films
2010s crime thriller films
2010s science fiction thriller films
2010s Hong Kong films
2010s Mandarin-language films
Hong Kong science fiction films